Lundevatn, or Lundevatnet, is a lake on the borders between the municipalities of Lund (in Rogaland county) and Flekkefjord (in Agder county) in Norway. The village of Moi lies at the northern end of the lake and the smaller village of Åna-Sira lies just south of the southern end of the lake. The lake has a small dam at the southern end and it is used for the nearby Åna-Sira Power Station.
 
This overdeepening, as well as its long and narrow shape, are characteristics of glacially-formed lakes.

See also
List of lakes in Norway

References

Lakes of Agder
Lakes of Rogaland
Lund, Norway
Flekkefjord